Huddersfield Business School is a school of the University of Huddersfield in West Yorkshire. It consists of five academic departments: Accountancy, Finance and Economics; Management;  Logistics, Operations, Hospitality and Marketing; Law (known as the Law School). In addition, the School has a Business Placement Unit and until recently had a Learning Development Unit which was recognised in the University's Teaching Excellence Framework submission.

The Building
The School was newly opened in September 2010. Its construction was funded by a £17 million investment  from the University. The School has four floors, containing several teaching rooms, computer labs, toilet facilities, a cafe, staff offices (for all component departments of the School) and a main reception.

Administration

The Dean of the School is Jill Johnes.

Awards
The University was awarded a Queen’s Award for Enterprise for International Trade in 2013. The award specifically recognised the growth in international students in the Business School and the quality of support provided for those students.

Notes

University of Huddersfield